Ian Neill Uttley (3 December 1941 – 15 September 2015) was a New Zealand rugby union player. He was a member of the New Zealand national side, the All Blacks, in two matches in Auckland in May 1963, both of them Tests against the touring England team. He was known as the "Grey Ghost".

His father, Kenneth Uttley, represented  and New Zealand Universities in rugby union, and also played first-class cricket for Otago and Wellington.

Uttley and his wife Christine died on 15 September 2015, when their vehicle went off the side of State Highway 5 near Te Pohue, overcorrected, and crossed into the path of a logging truck. Police suspect a third vehicle may have been involved.

References

1941 births
2015 deaths
Rugby union players from Christchurch
People educated at Wellington College (New Zealand)
Victoria University of Wellington alumni
New Zealand rugby union players
New Zealand international rugby union players
Wellington rugby union players
Auckland rugby union players
Hawke's Bay rugby union players
Rugby union centres
Road incident deaths in New Zealand